Terry Flanagan may refer to:

Terry Flanagan (boxer) (born 1989), English boxer
Terry Flanagan (footballer) (born 1950), Irish Association football (soccer) player
Terry Flanagan (ice hockey) (1956 – 1991), Canadian ice hockey player and coach 
Terry Flanagan (rugby league), English rugby league footballer of the 1970s and 1980s